Deborah Pritchard is a British composer. She is known for her concert works, a compositional approach informed by her synaesthesia, and her collaborative work with visual artists, most notably Maggi Hambling. She also paints music in the form of visualisations and music maps. In 2017 she won a British Composer Award for her solo violin piece Inside Colour and her new violin concerto Calandra will be premiered by Jennifer Pike and the BBC Symphony Orchestra in 2022.

Education 
Pritchard was awarded her undergraduate degree from the Guildhall School of Music and Drama where she trained as a composer and double bassist. She then completed a MMus degree in composition at the Royal Academy of Music where she studied with Simon Bainbridge, subsequently holding the position of Manson Fellow in Composition. She was awarded her DPhil from Worcester College, Oxford where she studied with Robert Saxton, now holding Associate Membership of The Faculty of Music. She was made Associate of the Royal Academy of Music in 2019 and will take up the position of Visiting Research Fellow at Keble College Oxford for six months from September 2022.

Career 
Her work received early attention following the inclusion of her piece Chanctonbury Ring on the album "The Hoxton Thirteen", released by NMC Recordings in 2001. Her music has since been released by labels including Signum Records, Nimbus, Linn Records, BIS Records, Hyperion Records and Orchid Classics.

Her music has been commissioned and premiered by ensembles including the London Symphony Orchestra, the London Sinfonietta, the BBC National Orchestra of Wales, Royal Northern Sinfonia, Philharmonia Orchestra, BBC Singers, Choir of New College, Oxford, Christ Church Cathedral Choir, English String Orchestra, Orchestra of the Swan, Chamber Domaine and the Composers Ensemble.

Recent works includes her meditation Peace for soprano and string quartet commissioned and premiered by Ruby Hughes and the Manchester Collective at the Wigmore Hall in July, 2021 and Towards Freedom for violin and piano commissioned and premiered by Charlie-Lovell Jones at the Royal Academy of Music in February 2022. Future premieres include a new violin concerto Calandra to be premiered by Jennifer Pike and the BBC Symphony Orchestra at the Barbican Centre in December 2022.

She was composer in residence at the 2016 Lichfield Festival and will be composer in residence at the 2022 Purbeck International Chamber Festival where Natalie Clein will premiere her new work for solo cello Radiance.

Synaesthesia 
Pritchard experiences synaesthesia, specifically perceiving sound as colour, light and darkness. In her own words; "Ever since I was a small child, I’ve been aware that some harmonies seemed warm whilst others appeared cold. The relationship between colours and intervals seemed so natural to me that I didn’t question it ... When I engage with colour, light and darkness in my work, I become aware of a broader emotional content and hope to illuminate some kind of beauty to the listener."Pritchard frequently paints visualisations of her musical works, and has also been commissioned by the London Sinfonietta to paint music maps of works by other composers (such as György Ligeti, Unsuk Chin and Thomas Adès) for inclusion in concert programme notes. Her visualisations and music maps were exhibited at the Royal Academy of Music's Amazing Women of the Academy exhibition from 2018-2019. In 2020 she was commissioned a graphic score Colour Circle by the London Sinfonietta to launch their Postcard Pieces project over lockdown, inspired by Wassily Kandinsky's book Concerning the Spiritual in Art.

Works inspired by visual art 
Pritchard has written several works in response to paintings by Maggi Hambling, having collaborated with the artist at her studio in Suffolk.

The first of these was the violin concerto Wall of Water (2014), which was premiered by violinist Harriet Mackenzie and the English String Orchestra during the Frieze Art Fair in London. Images of Hambling's series of seascape paintings, also titled Wall of Water, were projected during the performance.

Subsequent pieces written in response to Hambling's work were Waves and Waterfalls (2015) for chamber ensemble, commissioned by the London Sinfonietta, and Edge (2017), a double concerto for violin, harp and string orchestra, after Hambling's paintings on the theme of global warming, which was premiered at the Aldeburgh Festival. In 2020 Pritchard wrote a solo violin piece for Harriet Mackenzie called March 2020 in response to Hambling's painting of the same name, with both works written in lockdown.

Other artists on whose work Pritchard has drawn include Hughie O'Donoghue, George Shaw, Yinka Shonibare, Steinunn Thorarinsdottir, J.M.W. Turner and James Turrell.

Selected works 
 March 2020 (2020) for solo violin, in response to the painting by Maggi Hambling
 Green Renewed (2020) for solo cello
 Colour Circle (2020) graphic score for any instrument
 Trophies of Peace (2020) for choir, in response to Trophies by Steinunn Thorarinsdottir
 New College Service - Magnificat and Nunc Dimittis (2020) for choir
 The Heavens Declare (2019) for choir
 Mars in the Planets 2018 (2018) - first performed by the Ligeti Quartet
 River Above (2018) for solo saxophone
 Storm Song (2017) for soprano, piano and cello
 Edge (2017) for violin, harp and string orchestra, in response to the paintings by Maggi Hambling
 Inside Colour (2016) for solo violin
 Ode to Trumpet Boy (2016) for voice and double bass, in response to artwork by Yinka Shonibare
 Seven Halts on the Somme (2016) for trumpet, harp and string orchestra, in response to paintings by Hughie O'Donoghue
 From Night (2015) for solo cello
 Of The Heart (2015) for string orchestra
 The Angel Standing in the Sun (2015) for orchestra, in response to artwork by J.M.W. Turner
 Waves and Waterfalls (2015) for ensemble
 Benedicite (2014) for choir and trumpet
 From An Opaque Space (2014) for solo viola and film
 From Night (2014) for solo cello
 I Will Lift Up Mine Eyes Unto The Hills (2014) for choir
 Wall of Water (2014) for violin and string orchestra
 Skyspace (2012) for solo piccolo trumpet and string orchestra, in response to artwork by James Turrell.
 Lord's Prayer (2009) for choir
 Ascent (2001) for trumpet and piano
 Chanctonbury Ring (2000) for Pierrot Ensemble
 Four Short Movements (2000) for cello and piano

References 

1977 births
Living people
British women classical composers
Women musicologists
21st-century British composers
21st-century women composers